The Botanischer Garten Krefeld (3.6 hectares), more formally the Botanischer Garten der Stadt Krefeld, is a municipal botanical garden located at Sandberg 2, Krefeld, North Rhine-Westphalia, Germany. It is open daily in the warmer months; admission is free.

The garden was established in 1927–1928 as part of a small school. Today it contains about 5,000 species and varieties of plants in a plot edged with deciduous trees, shrubs, and conifers. Major garden features include a rose garden of some 3,000 specimens representing 150 rose varieties, an alpine garden, a medicinal herb garden, and a rhododendron area. Greenhouses contain cacti from South America and succulents from Africa, and other plants of the Canary Islands, carnivorous plants, and orchids.

See also 
 List of botanical gardens in Germany

References 

 Botanischer Garten Krefeld
 Garden photographs
 Krefeld entry
 Krefeld Wiki entry

Krefeld, Botanischer Garten
Krefeld, Botanischer Garten